The 2011 Croatian Figure Skating Championships ( took place between December 18 and 19, 2010 in Zagreb. Skaters competed in the disciplines of men's singles and ladies' singles across the levels of senior and junior.

Senior results

Men

Ladies

External links
 results
 Croatian Skating Federation 

2011
2011 in figure skating
2010 in figure skating